The 1997 World Weightlifting Championships were held in Chiang Mai, Thailand from December 6 to December 14. The women's competition in the 70 kg division was staged on 11 December 1997.

Medalists

Records

Results

New records

References
Weightlifting World Championships Seniors Statistics, Page 6 

1997 World Weightlifting Championships
World